Tayeb Zitouni is an Algerian politician, He was Minister of Moudjahidine of Algeria (Veterans) (2014-2021).

References 

1956 births
Government ministers of Algeria
Living people